Fire control is the practice of reducing the heat output of a fire, reducing the area over which the fire exists, or suppressing or extinguishing the fire by depriving it of fuel, oxygen, or heat (see fire triangle). Fire prevention and control is the prevention, detection, and extinguishment of fires, including such secondary activities as research into the causes of fire, education of the public about fire hazards, and the maintenance and improvement of fire-fighting equipment.

The three main components of a fire are fuel, heat and oxygen; without any one of the three, the fire cannot survive.

In the United States, fire are classified as Class-A fires, Class-B fires, Class-C fires, Class-D fires, and Class-K fires, but different classifications may exist in other countries. Each class is a specific type of fire that requires a specific control method based on its cause. Understanding the cause is essential so that the correct fire extinguisher is used; if the wrong extinguisher is used, it can either make the fire worse or not control it. For example, using a type A, B, C fire extinguisher on a chemical fire will do the opposite of what the extinguisher is supposed to do and can cause an explosion. The different types of fire extinguishers include CO2 fire extinguishers, type A, B, or C carbon dioxide fire extinguishers, and water-based fire extinguishers.

Carbon dioxide is released from CO2 extinguishers to smother the fire and prevent the fire from getting oxygen, which will suppress the fire. Class A extinguishers are meant to be used on fires that have wood, paper, and plastic, Class B fire extinguishers are meant be used on liquid fires such as oils, gasoline, kerosene, and paint, and Class C fire extinguishers are to be used on electrical equipment. When using a fire extinguisher, it is crucial to understand how the extinguisher works and where to point it. P.A.S.S. is an acronym (Pull, Aim, Squeeze, Shoot) to help remember how to use the extinguisher.

Class-A fires 

A Class A Fire is a fire that consist of paper, wood, and plastics, which is one of the most common and simplest fires to put out with a fire extinguisher. This class of fire can simply be started as a lightning strike that hits a tree or from a backyard campfire that releases an ash that ignites nearby material.

The most common method to control a Class-A fire is to remove heat by spraying the burning solid fuels with water. Another control method would be to reduce the oxygen content in the immediate vicinity of the fire (i.e., "smother" the fire), such as by the introduction of an inert gas such as carbon dioxide.

In a wildfire, fire control includes various wildland fire suppression techniques such as defensible space, widening the fuel ladder, and removing fuel in the fire's path with firebreaks and backfires to minimize the brush fire reaching new combustible fuel and spreading further.

For a class A fire we use a Class A fire extinguisher to extinguish the fire. Class A fire extinguishers are used so one can smother the fire. The specific chemicals used are phosphate and monoammonium. Spray and sway from the base.

Class-B fires 

Many Class B fires (hydrocarbons, petroleum, and similar fuels) cannot be efficiently controlled with water because fuels with a density less than water, such as gasoline or oil, float on water, resulting in the fire continuing to burn the fuel on top of the water. The configuration of some fuels, such as coal and baled waste paper, result in a deep seated and burrowing fire, resulting in less effective fire control by the application of water on the outer surfaces of the fuel. Class B fires should be extinguished with foam, powder, or carbon dioxide extinguishers. Some Class-B fires can be controlled with the application of chemical fire suppressants. Applying a combination of fire suppressant foam mixed with water is a common and effective method of forming a blanket on top of the liquid fuel, which eliminates the oxygen needed for combustion.

Class-C fires 

Class-C fires involve electricity as a continuous power source for the ignition of the fuels associated with electrical equipment, such as plastic cable jackets. The application of water does not always result in effective fire control, and there is a general concern regarding conductivity and personnel safety, possibly resulting in electrical shock. Class C fires can be effectively controlled by removing the oxygen with a dry powder or carbon dioxide, dry chemical ABC extinguisher. The source of electricity also needs to be removed to eliminate re-ignition. Once the electricity is removed, the result is a Class A or B fire, where foam or dry chemical powder can be used to further control the fire.

For electrical fires, one must always cut the source of electricity if safe to do so. We use a Class C fire extinguisher that has Both monoammonium phosphate and sodium bicarbonate. Spray and sway from the base left to right.

Class-D fires 
Class-D fires include combustible metals which include potassium, uranium, sodium, lithium, calcium, and plutonium. The most common fires that occur for Class D are magnesium and titanium. The best way to extinguish a Class-D fire is to use a dry powder fire extinguisher. By using the powder extinguisher, it smothers the fire along with absorbing the heat that the fire produces and causes the fire to be extinguished.

Class- K fires 
Class-K fires include cooking oils and grease fires, for example animal and vegetable fats. When cooking in the kitchen, it is extremely important to understand what a class K fire is. When a class K fire occurs, water should not be used, as it will disperse the material and cause the fire to grow rapidly. The correct fire extinguisher to use in this instance is the Class K fire extinguisher which is the wet chemical fire extinguisher.

Ventilation 

Fires can spread through the interior of a structure as the hot gases spread due to the expansion of the gases as a result of the combustion. Some fires can be partially controlled by venting these gases to the outside through manufactured heat vents in the structure's roof, or by the fire department cutting holes in the roof. Ventilation is important when it comes to the fire service, since it is "the systematic removal or heat, smoke and fire gases from a structure". The main purpose for ventilating a fire is to decrease the likelihood of a flashover from occurring. The best time to ventilate is before sending anyone into a structure so that the path the fire will take is through the roof and not through the front door when firefighters open it, allowing more oxygen to feed the fire.

See also 
 Fire classes
 Fire bucket

References

Firefighting
Wildfires
Wildfire suppression